Michel Auder (born 1945 in Soissons, France) is a French photographer and filmmaker. He lives and works in Brooklyn, New York.

Art career
His earliest works are travel logs and endearing portraits of friends including Hannah Wilke, Alice Neel, Annie Sprinkle, Eric Bogosian, Louis Waldon, and Larry Rivers. His work is often in the format of a video diary.

In 2004, the Williams College Museum of Art held a comprehensive exhibition of Auder's work.

His work was included in the 2014 Whitney Biennial.

Auder's work is included in the permanent collection of the Museum Brandhorst.

Personal life
Auder married painter/actress and author Viva in 1969 and together they had one daughter, Alexandra Auder, in February 1971. This event is included in the couple's film diaries.

Auder was married to Cindy Sherman from the early 1980s until the late 1990s.

Selected works
 Keeping Busy, 1969
 Cleopatra, 1970
 The Valerie Solanas Incident, 1971
 Chelsea Girls with Andy Warhol, 1971–1976
 Chronicles: Family Diaries, 1971-1973 (Excerpts)
 Made for Denise, 1978
 Seduction of Patrick, 1979
 Portrait of Alice Neel, 1976–1982
 Chasing the Dragon, 1982
 Flying, 1983
 The Games: Olympic Variations, 1984
 My Last Bag of Heroin (For Real), 1986
 Brooding Angels, Made for R.L., 1988
 Roman Variations, 1991
 Voyage to the Center of the Phone Lines, 1993
 Polaroid Cocaine, 1993
 Louis Waldon, 1994
 The Vanuatu Chronicles, 1998
 T.W.U. Richard Serra, An Unsolicited Video by Michel Auder, 1980–82, re-edit 2002
 Louis Waldon in Chronicles: Los Angeles/Bel-Air (July 1999), 2002
 Chronicles: Columbian Wedding (April 1999), 2002
 Morocco 1972: The Real Chronicles with Viva, 2002
 Chronicles: Van's Last Performance, 1971, edited 2002
 The World Out of My Hands, 2006
 New Mexico Chronicles, 2006
 The Feature (with SeeThink Productions), 2007
 Endless Column, 2011

Collections
 Museum Brandhorst, Münich
 Kadist Collection, Paris

References

External links
 Official site

Living people
French video artists
1945 births
French contemporary artists
Artists from New York City
French expatriates in the United States
People from Soissons